The Bitburg Reservoir is a flood retention basin on the River Prüm in Biersdorf am See and Wiersdorf in the Eifel mountains of Germany. It is about 12 kilometres northwest of the town of Bitburg and not far from the city of Trier in the state of Rhineland-Palatinate. 

The dam, a 15-metre-high earth dam, was built by the Zweckverband Stausee Bitburg for flood protection at a spot where the narrow and deeply incised valley of the Prüm opened into a valley bowl, that used to be constantly in danger of flooding. The roughly 2-kilometre-long and up to nine-metre-deep reservoir allows the regulation of low water levels, enables the generation of electricity, and offers a place of recreation, making it a popular destination and tourist centre in the South Eifel. Around the lake there is a five-kilometre-long circular path and many other good hiking trails, some of which are lit at night. The hiking network of the German-Luxembourg Nature Park starts here.

Sporting and recreational activities include rowing, paddling, surfing, pedaloes, inline skating, mountain biking, badminton, cycling and fishing (for trout). in the middle of the lake is a large fountain.

See also 
 List of dams in Germany

Gallery

External links 
  
 Stausee Bitburg at www.eifel-gps.de
 Stausee Bitburg in Biersdorf am See at www.eifel-direkt.de
 Stausee Bitburg in Biersdorf am See at www.eifel.de
 Photographs of the lake (private website)

Reservoirs in Rhineland-Palatinate 
Dams in Rhineland-Palatinate
Earth-filled dams
Buildings and structures in Bitburg-Prüm
Reservoirs in the Eifel
1970s architecture